The Taeng River or Mae Taeng River is a tributary of the Ping River, one of the two main contributories of the Chao Phraya River. It originates in the Daen Lao Range in Wiang Haeng District, Chiang Mai Province, Thailand, very near to the border with Burma. It then flows through Chiang Dao District and Mae Taeng District, separating the Thanon Thong Chai Range from the Daen Lao Range, into the Ping River. It is a popular river for white water rafting due to the existence of many grade 3-5 rapids.

Rivers of Thailand
Geography of Chiang Mai province